William Tatum Burns (January 12, 1916 – February 10, 1966) was an American Negro league pitcher between 1935 and 1945.

A native of West Palm Beach, Florida, Burns made his Negro league debut in 1935 with the Newark Dodgers. He went on to play for several teams, finishing his career in 1945 with the New York Cubans and the New York Black Yankees. Burns died in West Palm Beach in 1966 at age 50.

References

External links
 and Seamheads

1916 births
1966 deaths
Baltimore Elite Giants players
Chicago American Giants players
Indianapolis Clowns players
New York Black Yankees players
New York Cubans players
Newark Dodgers players
Newark Eagles players
Philadelphia Stars players
20th-century African-American sportspeople
Baseball pitchers